The 1972 All-Ireland Junior Hurling Championship was the 51st staging of the All-Ireland Junior Championship since its establishment by the Gaelic Athletic Association in 1912.

London entered the championship as the defending champions, however, they were beaten in the British Junior Championship.

The All-Ireland final was played on 1 October 1972 at the Athletic Grounds in Cork, between Cork and Hertfordshire, in what was their first ever meeting in the final. Cork won the match by 5–16 to 0–03 to claim their fifth championship title overall and a first tile in eight years.

Results

All-Ireland Junior Football Championship

All-Ireland semi-finals

All-Ireland home final

All-Ireland final

References

Junior
All-Ireland Junior Football Championship